RW11 may mean:

 RagWing RW11 Rag-A-Bond - an ultralight aircraft
 2003 RW11 - an asteroid